Dawsey is a surname. Notable people with the surname include:

Josh Dawsey, American journalist 
Lawrence Dawsey (born 1967), American football player
Tony Dawsey, American mastering engineer

English-language surnames